Argyra is a village in the municipal unit of Rio, Achaea, Greece. It is situated in the northern foothills of the Panachaiko, at about 450 m elevation. It is 2 km west of Sella and 7 km east of Rio. In 2011, it had a population of 288. A wind energy facility has been built about 4 km to the south.

Population

History

The ancient town Argyra was located near the river Selemnos, the spring Argyra and the town Boline. Both towns were already ruined in Pausanias' days (2nd century AD). According to local legend, Argyra was a sea-nymph, who fell in love with Selemnus and used to come up out of the sea to visit him, sleeping by his side. The ancient town is located between the villages of Ano Kastritsi and Argyra.

See also

List of settlements in Achaea

References

External links
Argyra at the GTP Travel Pages

Rio, Greece
Populated places in Achaea
Villages in Greece